is from Gifu Prefecture, Japan and Representative Director, President & Chief Executive Officer of J Trust Group which runs banking business, credit guarantee business and financial business in Asian countries.

References 

1970 births
Japanese chief executives
Living people